Sex and Zen III ("The Carnal Prayer Mat III - Hubby, I want it") is a 1998 Hong Kong comedy erotic film following Sex and Zen (1991) and Sex and Zen II (1996). The film is an adaptation of the Ming opera Yu Tang Chun (玉堂春) earlier adapted to cinema by King Hu as The Story of Sue San (1964).

Synopsis
Three maidens of poor background during the time of Song dynasty are sold by their families to the brothel Fragrance House run by madame Tall Kau (Lowell Chik). Susan (Karen Yeung) and Chinyun (Jane Chung) become closer during their training, while the third girl, ambitious Fanny (Tung Yi) keeps her distance. Eventually, the virginity of Susan is auctioned and bought by the horse tradesman Lui Tin (Elvis Tsui) from Lin'an but Lui gives Susan to Chu Chi-Ang (Timothy Zao), a young and inexperienced scholar he has befriended at the brothel and takes Fanny instead. Susan and Chi-Ang fall in love and Fanny, although she is taken as a concubine by Lui, knowing that Susan was Lui's first choice, grows increasingly jealous of her. After Chi-Ang runs out of his fortunes and is forced to leave the brothel, Lui buys Susan from Tall Kau and brings her home as a new concubine. Now, Fanny is convinced that Lui has an unmatched affection for Susan and plots for revenge.

Cast
 Karen Yeung: Susan
 Jane Chung: Chinyun
 Tung Yi: Fanny
 Lowell Chik: Tall Kau
 Timothy Zao: Chu Chi-Ang 
 Elvis Tsui: Lui Tin
 Ronald Wong Ban: Wong Lin
 Lo Meng: Hung Chi

References

External links
 
 lovehkfilms entry
 HK cinemagic entry

1990s sex comedy films
1998 films
Films directed by Aman Chang
Hong Kong sex comedy films
Sex and Zen
Films about prostitution in China
Films about virginity
1998 comedy films
1990s Hong Kong films
1990s Cantonese-language films